Damien Whitehead (born 24 April 1979) is an English former professional footballer who played in The Football League for Macclesfield Town.

Career
Whitehead started his career at non-league Warrington Town where his impressive goal scoring attracted the attentions of Macclesfield Town who signed him for a small fee. After scoring 14 goals in 57 appearances (20 starts, 37 sub) for the Silkmen he left and played semi-pro football in both the Republic of Ireland and Northern Ireland.

He signed for Drogheda United initially on a one-month deal in January 2002. He made his League of Ireland debut on 7 January at Whitehall Stadium. After spells at Drogheda and Finn Harps in the south, he went on to play for Omagh Town, Newry and Coleraine in the north.

Honours
 League of Ireland First Division:
 Drogheda United - 2001-02

References

1979 births
Living people
English footballers
Warrington Town F.C. players
Macclesfield Town F.C. players
Drogheda United F.C. players
Leigh Genesis F.C. players
Finn Harps F.C. players
Northwich Victoria F.C. players
Omagh Town F.C. players
Institute F.C. players
Newry City F.C. players
Coleraine F.C. players
English Football League players
League of Ireland players
NIFL Premiership players
Association football forwards